Euphorbia exserta, known by the common name of coastal sand spurge, is a member of the spurge family, Euphorbiaceae. It is a perennial herb, native to the southeastern United States, from central Florida to North Carolina.

References

exserta
Flora of Florida
Flora of Georgia (U.S. state)
Flora of South Carolina
Flora of North Carolina